Vinay Rai (born 18 September 1979) is an Indian actor who primarily appears in Tamil films. He is best known for his performance in the films Unnale Unnale (2007), Jayamkondaan (2008), Endrendrum Punnagai (2013) and Aranmanai (2014). He turned villain in Thupparivaalan (2017) and has played negative roles in several films including Doctor (2021), Etharkkum Thunindhavan (2022) and Christopher (2023).

Early life
Vinay was originally a commercial model in Mumbai. He played rugby for BRFC and was part of the Indian squad that toured Bahrain in 2001.

Career

2007–2009 
He debuted as an actor in director Jeeva's Unnale Unnale (2007) co-starring Sadha and Tanisha Mukherjee. The film became a huge success upon release and brought in more acting offers for Vinay. He was supposed to play the lead role in Gandhi Krishna's Ananda Thandavam but he was later replaced by newcomer Siddharth Venugopal.

Since his debut film, he has appeared in a Telugu language film, Vaana (2008), which flopped at the box-office and it was dubbed in Tamil as Gnabagangal Thalattum in 2013. Despite getting offers to act in romance films, Vinay stayed away from them and he stated that he didn't want to be stereotyped as a "chocolate boy". His second Tamil film Jayamkondaan (2008) was commercially and critically successful. Playing the role of an NRI civil engineer who returned to Chennai to set up his own business, his performance fetched positive reviews with a reviewer citing that "Vinay, as the protagonist is very comfortable in his role. He has expressive eyes, emotes well, and makes sure his audience isn't disappointed". In 2009, he starred in Saran's Modhi Vilayadu for which he dubbed in his own voice for the first time. The film, starring Kajal Aggarwal and Kalabhavan Mani, opened to mixed reviews from critics and became a box office failure. Three of his films including Veelle and Nootruku Nooru were shelved because the production companies went broke.

2011–2015 

He made a comeback in 2011 with a role in the English film, Dam 999, which had a poor commercial and critical response. The next year, Vinay appeared in the action comedy film Mirattal (2012), remake of the Telugu film Dhee (2007). The film, which starred Sharmila Mandre opposite him, got an average response. Vinay's performances received favourable reviews, with a reviewer citing that "Vinay Rai looks comfortable in his role and dishes out a neat performance". In 2013, he appeared in P. T. Selvakumar's comedy film Onbadhule Guru. Upon release, the film was panned by the critics for its weak direction, poor execution and crude humour. The same year, he played a supporting role in the comedy-drama film Endrendrum Punnagai co-starring Jiiva and Trisha. Upon release, the film won positive reviews citing that the film was "worth a watch" and a critic stated, "Vinay performs with no inhibitions in all his portions, be it comedy, dance or the emotional scenes and this film will prove to be a good vehicle for him to reach a larger audience". Vinay then acted in the horror comedy film Aranmanai (2014) directed by Sundar C. which turned out to be a blockbuster. His next release was Serndhu Polama (2015), co-starring Nyra Banerjee and Preethi Christina Paul, and directed by Malayalam film director Anil. The film, entirely shot in New Zealand, was released to negative reviews.

2017–present 

In 2017, he played a negative character in the crime thriller Thupparivaalan directed by Mysskin. The film opened to positive reviews with a critic from Sify claiming that "Vinay Rai as the ruthless baddie is a revelation". The same year, Vinay played a dual role in the long-delayed film Aayirathil Iruvar again with Saran. The film opened to negative reviews with a critic from IndiaGlitz stating, "Vinay who just impressed with his heartless killer in Thupparivaalan can forget Aayirathil Iruvar in a hurry as both his characters are written wafer thin with no underlying subtext for him to score".

His next venture Nethraa (2019) was a thriller film directed by A. Venkatesh co-starring Thaman Kumar and Subiksha. The film, which was extensively shot in Canada, opened to negative critical response upon release. In 2021, his films were Iruvar Ullam that was delayed after years and Nelson's action comedy, Doctor opposing the actor Sivakarthikeyan. Vinay Rai played the antagonist. Vinay Rai's performance adds to the tension created by the solid screenwriting and directing. He has also acted as the antagonist in Suriya’s film Etharkkum Thunindhavan directed by Pandiraj. He also playing a bad guy in Arun Vijay’s Oh My Dog   produced by Suriya and Jyothika under the banner of 2D Entertainment. Then, Vinay Rai acted as in the horror thriller genre Connect with Nayanthara as doctor husband.

Filmography

References

External links

1979 births
Indian male film actors
Male actors from Mumbai
Living people
Mangaloreans
Tulu people
Male actors in Tamil cinema
Male actors in Telugu cinema